Antonio Gino Bortoletti (23 January 1910 – 20 October 1990) was an Italian professional footballer, who played as a midfielder.

External links 
Profile at MagliaRossonera.it 

1910 births
1990 deaths
People from Mirano
Sportspeople from the Metropolitan City of Venice
Italian footballers
Association football midfielders
Serie A players
U.S. Triestina Calcio 1918 players
A.C. Milan players
Calcio Padova players
Footballers from Veneto